215th may refer to:

Military
215th Battalion (2nd Overseas Battalion of 38th Regiment Dufferin Rifles), CEF, a unit in the Canadian Expeditionary Force during the First World War
215th Infantry Division (German Empire), a unit in the German Imperial Army during the First World War
215th Infantry Brigade, a British Army Home Service formation during the First World War
215th Independent Infantry Brigade (Home) a British Army Home Service formation during the Second World War
CCXV (I Wessex) Brigade, Royal Field Artillery, a British Army Territorial Force unit during the First World War
215th Brigade, a Chinese formation (1937)
 215th Brigade of the Afghan National Army
 215th "Kala David"/"Sling of David" Artillery Brigade of the Israel Defense Forces' 162nd Division
 215th Artillery Brigade in the 87th Rifle Corps of the Red Army's Far Eastern Front during the Second World War

Civilian
215th Street (IRT Broadway – Seventh Avenue Line), a local station on the IRT Broadway – Seventh Avenue Line of the New York City Subway
American Astronomical Society 215th meeting (AAS) took place in Washington, D.C., Jan. 3 to Jan. 7, 2010

See also
215 (number)
215, the year 215 (CCXV) of the Julian calendar
215 BC